Yevgeny Viktorovich Korolkov (9 October 1930 – 24 December 2014) was a Soviet gymnast who competed at the 1952 Summer Olympics. He won a gold medal in the team competitions and a silver in the pommel horse. Similarly, at the 1954 World Championships he won a team gold and a silver on the rings. After retiring from competitions he worked as a gymnastics coach in Moscow. His trainees included Mikhail Voronin and Sergey Diomidov.

References

External links

 

1930 births
2014 deaths
Russian male artistic gymnasts
Soviet male artistic gymnasts
Olympic gymnasts of the Soviet Union
Olympic gold medalists for the Soviet Union
Olympic silver medalists for the Soviet Union
Olympic medalists in gymnastics
Gymnasts at the 1952 Summer Olympics
Medalists at the 1952 Summer Olympics
Medalists at the World Artistic Gymnastics Championships
Gymnasts from Moscow